"Don't Announce Your Husband's Death" is the sixth episode of the fifth season of the South Korean anthology series Drama Stage, produced by Studio Dragon and GTist for tvN. Directed by Choi Dong-suk and starring Kim Nam-hee and Park So-jin, this drama depicts an unprecedented safety pregnancy project that takes place when a man with a 1% chance of pregnancy lies for the safe delivery of a moody pregnant woman who doesn't know where to go. The episode will be aired on tvN on June 24, 2022, at 12:10 (KST).

Synopsis
A man and a woman are unfamiliar with the biological mother and father of a child. The two men and women end up protecting the child in their womb and becoming a better person.

Cast
 Kim Nam-hee as Yoon Jae-young 
 34 years old, CEO of digital funeral service 'Digital Cleaner'
 Park So-jin as Yoo Young-joo 
 38 years old, pregnant woman, a badminton player, but she withdrew due to her panic disorder.
 Kim Yoon-seo as Seo Do-yeon 
39 years old, head of Content Planning Department, One-Top Study
 Danny Ahn as Chan-beom Yoon
 42 years old, Korean language instructor at Denian Admissions Academy One-Top Study

Original soundtrack

Ratings

References

External links
 

2022 South Korean television episodes
Drama Stage